Rhuan da Silveira Castro (born 25 January 2000), simply known as Rhuan, is a Brazilian professional footballer. Mainly an attacking midfielder, he can also play as a forward.

Club career
Born in São Gonçalo, Rio de Janeiro, Rhuan represented Botafogo as a youth setup. In late July 2019, he was promoted to the first team by manager Eduardo Barroca.

Rhuan made his first team – and Série A – debut on 17 August 2019, coming on as a substitute for fellow youth graduate Bochecha in a 2–0 away loss against Corinthians.

References

External links

2000 births
Living people
People from São Gonçalo, Rio de Janeiro
Brazilian footballers
Association football midfielders
Association football forwards
Campeonato Brasileiro Série A players
Ekstraklasa players
Botafogo de Futebol e Regatas players
Radomiak Radom players
Brazilian expatriate footballers
Expatriate footballers in Poland
Brazilian expatriate sportspeople in Poland
Sportspeople from Rio de Janeiro (state)